Elmaz Abinader (born 1954 in Pennsylvania) is an American author, poet, performer, English professor at Mills College and co-founder of the Voices of Our Nation Arts Foundation (VONA). She is of Lebanese descent. In 2000, she received the PEN Oakland/Josephine Miles Literary Award for her poetry collection In the Country of My Dreams....

Life
Born in a small coal mining community in southwest Pennsylvania, she lived with her parents and her five siblings in a household strongly rooted in Lebanese tradition. Her childhood was spent helping out in her family store, attending Catholic church twice a day, and focusing on her schooling.  Abinader and her siblings faced challenges due to their ethnicity.

Abinader received her B.A. in Writing and Communication from University of Pittsburgh in 1974. It was during this time that she embrace her heritage and wrote about her family’s history. She earned her MFA in Poetry from Columbia University, School of the Arts Poetry Writing, in 1978. In 1985, she completed her PhD program at the University of Nebraska, English Fiction and Non-fiction Writing, where she taught English and creative writing.

Work
Abinader's first book, Children of the Roojme: A Family's Journey from Lebanon (Norton, 1991, University of Wisconsin, 1997), was published in 1997. This book, a memoir, crosses three generations of Lebanese and covers the challenges of finding a home away from their country. Her second publication, In the Country of My Dreams..., is a collections of poetry focused on dislocation and its various forms. This collection won the PEN Oakland/Josephine Miles Literary Award for Multi-cultural Poetry in 2000 and a Goldies Award for Literature. Along with her books, she has written and performed in several one-woman plays: Under The Ramadan Moon, Country of Origin, 32 Mohammeds, Voices From the Siege, and The Torture Quartet. Her play Country of Origin was performed at The Kennedy Center in 2009. Her plays have also been performed
	
Her passion for  Abinader co-founded The Voices of our Nations Arts Foundation (VONA), which holds workshops for writers of color, during the summer at the University of California Berkeley in 1999. Abinader is currently teaching creative writing at Mills College.

Bibliography

Books
"This House, My Bones" Willow Books, 2014
In the Country of My Dreams... Sufi Warrior Publishing, 1999
The Children of the Roojme, a Family’s Journey from Lebanon, Madison, University of Wisconsin Press, 1997             
The Children of the Roojme, a Family's Journey, New York: W. W. Norton & Company, 1991.

Performances
Imagining Peace, Southbank Centre, London UK, October 2010
Country of Origin, Arabesques Festival, Kennedy Center, Washington DC, March 2009
Lies War Discrimination, La Pena Cultural Center, Berkeley CA March 1, 2007
Cease Fire, La Pena Cultural Center, Berkeley CA, August 2006
Poetry and Music of Arab-Americans, Amazon Lounge, Fresno CA, April 20, 2006
Voices from the Siege, debuted 2006, La Pena Cultural Center, Berkeley
32 Mohammeds, Martin Segal Theater, New York NY, March 3, 2005
The Torture Quartet, debuted 2005, University of San Francisco
Flower Girl, Wyoming Arts Council, Casper College, Casper WY, October 2, 2004
32 Mohammeds, debuted, 2004 University of North Dakota
Ramadan Moon, debuted 2000, Porter Troupe Gallery, San Diego
Country of Origin, debuted 1997, University of California, Berkeley

Awards and residencies
2013 Writers in Residence, Grand Canyon National Park
2013 Residency Fellowship, Canserrat Artist Residency, Spain
2011 Teaching Fellowship, Palestine Writing Workshop
2010 Writer in Residence, El Gouna Writers Residency, Egypt
2010 Quigley Summer Fellowship
2010 Faculty Development Grant, Mills College
2007 Arts Fellowship, Silicon Valley Arts Council, Fiction
2006 Residency MacDowell Colony, Peterborough, NH
2006 Residency, Villa Montalvo, Saratoga, CA
2003 Endowed Chair, Mills College
2003 Pushcart Prize Nomination for The Silence
2003 Residency, Chateau La Vigny, Switzerland
2002 Goldies Award, San Francisco Bay Guardian Recognition in Arts
2000 PEN Oakland/Josephine Miles Literary Award, Poetry
1999 Drammy, Oregon’s Drama Award, for Country of Origin, at IFCC
1998-1999 Fulbright Senior Scholarship Egypt
1997-1998; 2000-2003 Quigley Fellowship
1994-2005 Faculty Development Grant, Mills College 
1996, 1995, 1994 Quigley Summer Fellowship 
1995 Best All Around Award, Writers’ Harvest, Share Our Strength, Annapolis

References

1954 births
Poets from California
American writers of Lebanese descent
American women poets
Columbia University School of the Arts alumni
Living people
Mills College faculty
University of Pittsburgh alumni
University of Nebraska alumni
Writers from Oakland, California
Writers from Pennsylvania
Activists from Oakland, California
PEN Oakland/Josephine Miles Literary Award winners
20th-century American poets
21st-century American poets
20th-century American women writers
American women academics
21st-century American women writers